Ur is a hypothetical supercontinent that formed in the Archean   (3.1 billion).

In a reconstruction by Rodgers, Ur is half a billion years older than Arctica and, in the early period of its existence, it was probably the only continent on Earth, and as such can be considered a supercontinent, though it was probably smaller than present-day Australia.  In more recent works geologists often refer to both Ur and other proposed Archaean continental assemblages as supercratons.  Ur can, nevertheless, be half a billion years younger than Vaalbara, but the concepts of these two early cratonic assemblages are incompatible.

Incompatible reconstructions
About 1,300–1,071 Mya, Ur joined the continents Nena and Atlantica to form the supercontinent Rodinia. In other reconstructions, however, India and East Antarctica did not collide until Rodinia formed 1,071 Mya. Furthermore, in the Early Archaean Earth's mantle was 200 °C hotter than today and many characteristics of modern tectonics, such as ophiolites, blueschists, lawsonite-bearing eclogites, and ultra-high-pressure rocks, did not exist or were rare. This makes most proposed Archaean supercontinents controversial, including Rogers's 3 Gya supercontinent.

Reconstructions of the supercontinent Vaalbara places two cratons, Kaapvaal in southern Africa and Pilbara in western Australia next to each other based on stratigraphic similarities.  In Roger's configuration of Ur, these cratons are placed far apart in their Gondwana configuration.  This configuration is contradicted by widespread Precambrian collisional events between Australia and Africa.

Vaalbara and Zimgarn, according to this proposal, both disintegrated about 2.1–2.0 Gya to reassemble as the Kalahari and West Australian cratons 2.524–1.507 Gya. Smirnov et al. based this reconstruction on: (1) Zimgarn was still undergoing cratonisation when an extensive carbonate platform developed over Vaalbara; (2) the magmatic signatures are different for the two supercratons during the period 2.6–2.0 Gya; and (3) paleomagnetic latitudes for 2.69 Gya are slightly different.

Original concept and later interpretations
Important geological similarities link now remote Archaean cratons in India (Singhbhum and Dharwar), western Australia (Kilbaran and Pilbara), and southern Africa (Kaapvaal and Zimbabwe) which indicate that these protolithic shields were close together in the Mid-Archaean. Other Archaean continental assemblages are considerably younger: Arctica (Baltica, Laurentia, Ur, and Siberia) consolidated around 2.565 Gya, Atlantica (West Africa and eastern South America) consolidated around 2.11 Gya. In some reconstructions the shields of Ur stayed near each other until the Mesozoic break-up of Gondwana.

The cratons that had become stable around 3 Gya were all in the same region within Pangaea, which is the main argument for them having formed a single continent 3 billion years ago.  The Kaapvaal craton in southern Africa became stable around 3.1 Gya. The Pilbara craton in western Australia is not well defined but formed around 3 Gya.  Three cratons in East Antarctica are of similar age but not well known.  These cratons share similar geological histories and are therefore assumed to have formed the continent Vaalbara.

Three small areas in the Indian Ocean coast of Antarctica are also about 3 Gya old: western Dronning Maud Land, the Napier complex, and the Vestfold Hills.  Within Gondwana, these areas were in a belt of Grenville-age deformation, and because there is no evidence of ocean closure in this belt (except in Africa), the 1 Ga orogen can be assumed to be intra-continental.  Consequently, the southern margin of Ur is now below the Antarctic ice cover.

Two cratons in India of equal age, Western Dharwar and Singhbhum, were also part of Ur.  Two other Indian cratons, Eastern Dharwar and Bhandara, also formed around 3 Gya but underwent extensive magmatism around 2.5 Gya not seen elsewhere and their relation to Ur is unclear.  Ur, nevertheless, became larger around 2.524 Gya, and this so-called "Expanded Ur" incorporated the Zimbabwe Craton in Africa and the Yilgarn Craton in Australia.

The largest preserved parts of Ur are now in India: Aravalli, Dharwar, Bundelkhand, and Singhbhum.  The Central Indian Tectonic Zone is the modern suture between the Bundelkhand-Aravalli block and the other Archaean blocks.  2.8–2.6 Gya metamorphism in Dharwar and Bundelkhand indicate that the stabilisation of Ur probably continued until the end of that period.

References

Notes

Sources

External links
 

Archean
Former supercontinents
Historical continents